Astrostole is a genus of sea stars in the family Asteriidae.

Species
 Astrostole insularis Clark, 1938
 Astrostole multispina Clark, 1950
 Astrostole paschae Clark, 1920
 Astrostole platei Meissner 1896
 Astrostole rodolphi Perrier, 1875
 Astrostole scabra Hutton, 1872

References

Asteriidae